Francis Morshead Lloyd  Fitzwilliams (1907-1976) was an Irish born English rower.

Rowing
He competed in the coxless four at the 1930 British Empire Games for England and won a gold medal with Arthur Harby, Humphrey Boardman and Hugh Edwards and won a second gold medal as part of the eight.

Personal life
He was a clerk at the time of the 1930 Games.

References

1907 births
1976 deaths
English male rowers
Commonwealth Games medallists in rowing
Commonwealth Games gold medallists for England
Rowers at the 1930 British Empire Games
Medallists at the 1930 British Empire Games